Mir is Ott's third album. It was released on 15 March 2011 on his  Bandcamp.

Track listing 
"One Day I Wish to Have This Kind of Time" - 8:33
"Adrift in Hilbert Space" - 8:10
"Owl Stretching Time" - 7:41
"Squirrel and Biscuits" - 6:02
"A Nice Little Place" - 7:13
"Mouse Eating Cheese" - 7:38
"The Aubergine of the Sun" - 10:09

Samples
Alan Watts is sampled in this album.

External links
Mir on Ott's Bandcamp

Ott (record producer) albums
2011 albums